AB-001 (1-pentyl-3-(1-adamantoyl)indole) is a designer drug that was found as an ingredient in synthetic cannabis smoking blends in Ireland in 2010 and Hungary and Germany in 2011. It is unclear who AB-001 was originally developed by, but it is structurally related to compounds such as AM-1248 and its corresponding 1-(tetrahydropyran-4-ylmethyl) analogue, which are known to be potent cannabinoid agonists with moderate to high selectivity for CB2 over CB1. The first published synthesis and pharmacological evaluation of AB-001 revealed that it acts as a full agonist at CB1 (EC50 = 35 nM) and CB2 receptors (EC50 = 48 nM). However, AB-001 was found to possess only weak cannabimimetic effects in rats at doses up to 30 mg/kg, making it less potent than the carboxamide analogue APICA, which possesses potent cannabimimetic activity at doses of 3 mg/kg.

See also 
 A-834,735
 AB-005
 AM-1248
 APICA
 JWH-018
 JWH-250
 RCS-4
 RCS-8
 MN-25
 UR-144
 Structural scheduling of synthetic cannabinoids
 Adamantane

References 

Cannabinoids
Designer drugs
Adamantanoylindoles